The Regiment "Cavalleggeri di Lucca" (16th) ( - "Chevau-légers of Lucca") is an inactive cavalry unit of the Italian Army.

History

Formation 
On 26 April 1859 the Second Italian War of Independence broke out and two days later Grand Duke Leopold II left Tuscany, which was quickly occupied by Sardinian troops. On 23 July 1859 the Tuscan National Assembly ordered to form a Chevau-légers Division which on 14 November 1859 was renamed Regiment "Cavalleggeri di Lucca". The regiment was based in Pisa and consisted a staff, and two squadrons. Each squadron fielded five officers and 120 Chevau-légers, while the staff consisted of twelve officers and non-commissioned officers.

On 8 December 1859 the Grand Duchy of Tuscany, Duchy of Parma, Duchy of Modena and the Papal Legations were merged into the United Provinces of Central Italy, which on 22 March 1860 were annexed by the Kingdom of Sardinia. On 26 March 1860 the Regiment "Cavalleggeri di Lucca" and the other Tuscan cavalry regiment, the Regiment "Cavalleggeri di Firenze", were integrated into the Royal Sardinian Army.

In 1862-64 the regiment operated initially in the Cerignola and Stornarella area and then in the San Fele and Rapolla area to suppress the anti-Sardinian revolt in Southern Italy after the Kingdom of Sardinia had invaded and annexed the Kingdom of Two Sicilies. In 1866 the regiment participated in the Third Italian War of Independence, during which it fought in the Battle of Custoza. Over the next years the regiment repeatedly changed its name:

 10 September 1871: 16th Regiment of Cavalry (Lucca)
 5 November 1876: Cavalry Regiment "Lucca" (16th)
 16 December 1897: Regiment "Cavalleggeri di Lucca" (16th)

In 1887 the regiment contributed to the formation of the 1st Cavalry Squadron Africa and the Mounted Hunters Squadron, which fought in the Italo-Ethiopian War of 1887–1889. In 1895-96 the regiment provided one officer and 71 enlisted for units deployed to Italian Eritrea for the First Italo-Ethiopian War. Between its founding and World War I the Lucca ceded on four occasions one of its squadrons to help form new regiments:

 16 February 1864: Regiment "Cavalleggeri di Caserta" (17th)
 1 October 1883: Regiment "Cavalleggeri di Padova" (21st)
 1 November 1887: Regiment "Cavalleggeri di Umberto I" (23rd)
 1 October 1909: Regiment "Cavalleggeri di Treviso" (28th)

Italo-Turkish War 
In 1911 the regiment was transferred to Libya for the Italo-Turkish War. There the regiment fought in the Battle Al Qawarishah and the Battle of Due Palme. In 1912 the regiment's depot in Saluzzo formed a 6th and a 7th squadron for deployment to Libya. The two squadrons remained on garrison duty in Italian Libya until January 1915, when they were transferred to Palermo to form the II Group of the Regiment "Cavalleggeri di Palermo" (30th), which was activated on 29 April 1915.

World War I 
At the outbreak of World War I the regiment consisted of a command, the regimental depot, and two cavalry groups, with the I Group consisting of three squadrons and the II Group consisting of two squadrons and a machine gun section. The regiment fought dismounted in the trenches of the Italian Front. In 1916 the regiment ceded its 1st Squadron temporarily to the Regiment "Cavalleggeri di Treviso" (28th). The same year the regiment fought in the Battle of Gorizia.

In fall 1916 the regiment was sent to the Albanian front, where it joined the Regiment "Cavalleggeri di Lodi" (15th). In 1917 the regimental depot in Saluzzo formed the 1499th Dismounted Machine Gunners Company as reinforcement for infantry units on the front. In 1918 the regiment fought in Albania and then on the Macedonian front.

Interwar years 
After the war the Italian Army disbanded 14 of its 30 cavalry regiments and so on 21 November 1919 the II Group of the Lucca was renamed "Cavalleggeri di Padova" as it consisted of personnel and horses from the disbanded Regiment "Cavalleggeri di Padova" (21st). On 20 May 1920 the army disbanded four more cavalry regiments and this time also the "Cavalleggeri di Lucca" was disbanded. Two of the squadrons of the Lucca, together with the regiment's traditions, were transferred to the Regiment "Cavalleggeri Guide" (19th), while one squadron, which before had been part of the Cavalleggeri di Padova was transferred to the Regiment "Cavalleggeri di Monferrato" (13th).

World War II 

On 1 March 1943 the Motorized Regiment "Cavalleggeri di Lucca" (16th) was formed in Bologna by the regimental depot of the Regiment "Lancieri Vittorio Emanuele II" (10th). The regiment consisted of the following units:

 Motorized Regiment "Cavalleggeri di Lucca" (16th)
 Command Squadron
 Motorcyclists Squadron
 Self-propelled Squadron, with 75/18 self-propelled guns
 Transport Unit
 3x Dismounted groups
 2x truck-transported squadrons
 Support Weapons and Anti-aircraft Squadron, with 75/18 self-propelled guns and 20/65 anti-aircraft guns
 Mortar Squadron, with 81mm Mod. 35 mortars

The regiment fielded 92 officers, 127 non-commissioned officers, 1,611 enlisted men, 293 drivers, and one military chaplain. The equipment of the regiment included 4x AB41 armored cars), 24x 75/18 self-propelled guns, 16x 20/65 anti-aircraft guns, and 27x 81mm Mod. 35 mortars.

On 1 April 1943 the regiment was assigned to the 135th Armored Cavalry Division "Ariete". After the announcement of the Armistice of Cassibile on 8 September 1943 the division was tasked with defending Rome against invading German forces. On 9 September 1943 the division blocked the advance of the German 3rd Panzergrenadier Division and elements of the 26th Panzer Division. In Monterosi the German vanguard was blocked by the division's mixed engineer battalion, the "Cavalleggeri di Lucca", and the III Group of the 135th Artillery Regiment. After the flight of the Italian King Victor Emmanuel III and his government from Rome the division was ordered on 10 September to move to Tivoli and abandon the defense of Rome. There the division, including the "Cavalleggeri di Lucca", was disbanded by the Germans on 12 September 1943.

References

Cavalry Regiments of Italy